Long words
English words